Plinkaigalis (formerly) is a village in Kėdainiai district municipality, in Kaunas County, in central Lithuania. According to the 2011 census, the village had a population of 319 people.

There is the Plinkaigalis hillfort on the confluence of the Šušvė and Žiedupė. Also an ancient burial place with rich grave goods had been found nearby.

History
Plinkaigalis village is known since 1595. In 1632 eleven families lived here and six in 1662. During the 18th century the village once had been deserted but later repopulated as the Krakės manor settlement. During the Soviet era it was a kolkhoz center.

Demography

Images

References

Villages in Kaunas County
Kėdainiai District Municipality